Robert Henley-Ongley, 1st Baron Ongley (c. 1721 – 23 October 1785), was a British politician.

Born Robert Henley, the son of Robert Henley of London, he assumed the additional surname of Ongley as heir to the estate of his great-uncle, Sir Samuel Ongley, of Old Warden, Bedfordshire. He was educated at Christ Church, Oxford and studied law at the Middle Temple.

He was returned to Parliament for Bedford in 1754, a seat he held until 1761, and then sat as a Knight of the Shire for Bedfordshire between 1761 and 1780 and again between 1784 and 1785. In 1776 he was elevated to the Irish peerage as Baron Ongley, of Old Warden. (An Irish peerage did not oblige him to give up his seat in the House of Commons).

Lord Ongley married Frances Gosfright, daughter and co-heir of Richard Gosfright, of Langton Hall, Essex, in 1763. They had two sons and four daughters. He died in October 1785 and was buried in a mausoleum in the churchyard of St Leonard's church in Old Warden in Bedfordshire, built at his request by his widow in 1787. He was succeeded in the barony by his eldest son, Robert.

References

1785 deaths
Politicians from London
Alumni of Christ Church, Oxford
Members of the Middle Temple
Barons in the Peerage of Ireland
Peers of Ireland created by George III
Year of birth uncertain
Members of the Parliament of Great Britain for English constituencies
British MPs 1754–1761
British MPs 1761–1768
British MPs 1768–1774
British MPs 1774–1780
British MPs 1780–1784
British MPs 1784–1790
Tory members of the Parliament of Great Britain